Vladimir Tolokonnikov (born October 13, 1973) is a Russian and Soviet former professional ice hockey defenceman. He is a one-time Russian Champion.

Awards and honors

References

External links
Biographical information and career statistics from Eliteprospects.com, or The Internet Hockey Database

1973 births
Living people
Ak Bars Kazan players
Atlant Moscow Oblast players
Russian ice hockey defencemen